ClubCorp is a privately held American corporation based in Dallas and it is the largest owner and operator of private golf and country clubs in the country. It owns and operates more than 200 golf country clubs, businesses, sports and alumni clubs worldwide. Located in 26 states, the District of Columbia, and 2 countries outside of the United States (Mexico and China), the company and its clubs have more than 430,000 members and employ around 20,000 people.

Management
The company was founded by the late Robert H. Dedman, Sr. (1926-2002) as Country Club, Inc., later renamed ClubCorp. His son, Robert H. Dedman, Jr., became president in 1989 and CEO in 1998. His daughter, Patty Dedman Dietz, was previously on its board of directors. In 2002, its CEO was John A. Beckert. Private equity firm KSL Capital Partners bought the company in 2006. ClubCorp Holdings, Inc. went public in 2013 and was traded on the New York Stock Exchange under the symbol MYCC until 2017 when the company was acquired by Apollo Global Management.

Eric L. Affeldt is a former CEO of the company. Golf magazine named him the most powerful person in golf in 2010 and 2014.

ClubCorp hired David Pillsbury as the new CEO in June 2018

History
ClubCorp was founded by Robert H. Dedman on November 11, 1957, and construction began on Brookhaven Country Club in the Farmers Branch suburb of Dallas. Legendary golfer and famous Texan, Byron Nelson, served as the chairman of the advisory board during construction. Brookhaven held an open house in 1959 to show off the 26,000 square foot informal wing.  In 1965, ClubCorp expanded to include city clubs, similar to country clubs but without golf courses. By the 1970s, ClubCorp served as the management consultant for more than 50 private clubs. In 1971, The University Club of Houston opens (Texas) near the Galleria complex and is the world's first indoor climate-controlled tennis complex. In the 1970s ClubCorp offered reciprocal privileges, meaning a member of any ClubCorp club could attend other clubs. In 1975, they bought 13 additional clubs, including the Inverrary Country Club, home to the PGA Tour. In 1976, ClubCorp Realty is formed to develop residential communities around country clubs.

In 1981, ClubCorp acquired Firestone Country Club in Akron, OH, from the Firestone Family. Shortly after, in 1984, the company bought golf courses, hotels and other properties in Pinehurst, North Carolina. After acquiring Pinehurst Resort, Club Resorts was founded in the management of destination golf and conference resorts. Resort Guests are treated as "Members for their Stay." They also bought Mission Hills Country Club in Rancho Mirage, California and Indian Wells Country Club in Indian Wells, California, Gleneagles Country Club in West Plano, Texas, Stonebriar Country Club in Frisco, Texas and Las Colinas Country Club in Irving, Texas. They also bought The Homestead in Hot Springs, Virginia in 1993, Barton Creek, Austin, Texas and Daufuskie Island off Hilton Head, South Carolina. In 1986, ClubCorp began publishing Private Clubs magazine as a vehicle for communicating to members. In 1998, Private Clubs earned the distinction of having the most affluent audience in America.

In 1998, ClubCorp entered into an agreement for Golden Bear International, Jack Nicklaus's company, to design 36 new golf courses, co-owned and operated by ClubCorp. In 1999, they partnered with the American Golf Corporation to buy 45 properties from Cobblestone Golf for $393 million. It also became ClubLink Corp.'s largest shareholder for $32.5 million; ClubLink Corp. owned 23 golf courses in Canada. It has also partnered with PGA European Tour to build more golf courses outside the United States.

In 2014, ClubCorp acquired Sequoia Golf Holdings, Inc. For $265 million, expanding its portfolio by 30 percent. The 50 owned-and-operated clubs included The Woodlands Country Club, home of the Champions Tour's Insperity Invitational.

In March 2017, ClubCorp announced the acquisition of the Rockville, Maryland-based club, Norbeck Country Club.

The acquisition was the third of the year.

Timeline

1957: Robert H. Dedman Sr. Founds ClubCorp on November 11.

1960: Brookhaven Country Club holds its grand opening on Easter Sunday in the recently completed clubhouse, becoming the world’s largest golf club at the time.

1966: The Lancers Club, ClubCorp’s first city club, opens in downtown Dallas, Texas.

1968: The University Club of Jacksonville, Florida opens as ClubCorp’s first city and athletic club.

1974: The Metropolitan Club opens in the Sears (now Willis) Tower in Chicago, Illinois.

1981: ClubCorp acquires Firestone Country Club in Akron, Ohio. Firestone Country Club was established in 1929 by Harvey Firestone and hosts the World Golf Championships – NEC Invitational (known today as the WGC-Bridgestone Invitational).

1984: ClubCorp acquires Pinehurst Resort and Country Club in Pinehurst, NC for $16,000,000 from a consortium of 4 banks who wrote off $100,000,000 in debt. Within 5 years, Pinehurst was making more annually than its acquisition cost. Pinehurst #2 has hosted 2 United States Open Golf Championships plus the upcoming 2014 tournament.

1993: In October, ClubCorp assumes the management and co-ownership of The Homestead in Hot Springs, Virginia, and Barton Creek Resort & Spa in Austin, Texas.

1994: ClubCorp develops and opens Capital Club in Beijing; and the U.S. Senior Open is conducted at Pinehurst in July.

1996: ClubCorp develops and opens Tower Club in Singapore.

1998: Alumni clubs Boston College Club and University of Texas Club open.

1999: ClubCorp purchases 16 golf and country clubs from the Cobblestone Golf Group, and hosts one of the most successful U.S. Open Championships in history at Pinehurst.

2005: ClubCorp hosts the U.S. Open at Pinehurst; and University of Massachusetts Club opens.

2006: KSL acquires ClubCorp.

2010: ClubCorp acquires The Country Club of the South in Georgia. The Club, with its signature Jack Nicklaus course, further expands the ClubCorp portfolio in the greater Atlanta market. Also in Atlanta, the historic Commerce Club aligns with the One Ninety One Club to form the new renovated and expanded Commerce Club. ClubCorp develops and opens The Texas Tech Club in Lubbock, Texas.

2011: ClubCorp expands in New York (The Hamlet, Willow Creek and Wind Watch golf and country clubs) and Washington state (Canterwood Golf & Country Club).

2012: ClubCorp adds Mission Hills Golf Club & Resort in China to its network of properties in its reciprocal access program. ClubCorp expands its club management portfolio with LPGA International and Hollytree Country Club, and acquires Hartefeld National. The iconic Houston Club joins forces with Downtown Clubs of Houston’s Plaza location to form the new Houston Club in a new, renovated location at One Shell Plaza.

2013: ClubCorp expands in Oklahoma (Oak Tree Country Club) and New Jersey (Cherry Valley Country Club). ClubCorp sells 5 resorts to Omni Hotels & Resorts.

2014: ClubCorp acquires Sequoia Golf which includes 43 private, 6 public golf and country clubs and 1 sports club. Additional acquisitions included Rolling Green Country Club and Ravinia Green Country Club in the Chicago area, and Oro Valley Country Club in Arizona.

2015: ClubCorp acquires six clubs in one purchase in North Carolina (Bermuda Run Country Club and Firethorne Country Club), Georgia (Brookfield Country Club), Virginia (Ford's Colony Country Club), Tennessee (Temple Hills Country Club) and Florida (Legacy Golf Club at Lakewood Ranch).

2016:  ClubCorp announces closure of University Club in Jacksonville Florida, effective Dec 20, 2016.

2017:  On September 18, ClubCorp is acquired by Certain Investment Funds Affiliated with Apollo Global Management in an All-Cash Transaction Valued at $1.1 Billion.  Shareholders received $17.12 per share.  The stock MYCC is removed from the NYSE.

2018:  ClubCorp hired David Pillsbury as the new CEO in June 2018

Private Clubs magazine 
In 1986, ClubCorp began publishing its own travel and lifestyle magazine, Private Clubs. The magazine was an award winner in one of the most prestigious contests in the magazine industry, the FOLIO: Awards. By 2020, Private Clubs had transitioned into a digital-only publication and changed its name to ClubLife.

Charity Classic 
Founded in 2007, the annual ClubCorp Charity Classic is one of the world’s largest golf and dining charity events. Each year, private clubs in the ClubCorp family are open to the public for a variety of charity events nationwide including golf and tennis tournaments, swim-a-thons, 5k runs, carnivals and chili cook-offs.

References

External links 
 ClubCorp Corporate
 Private Clubs Magazine
 Firestone Country Club
 Mission Hills Country Club 
 Gleneagles Country Club
 Las Colinas Country Club

Entertainment companies established in 1957
Companies based in Dallas
1957 establishments in Texas